The Depraved may refer to:

 Adélaïde (film), also known as The Depraved, a 1968 French drama film
 The Depraved (1957 film), a British crime film
 The Depraved aka Urban Explorer, a 2011 German horror film

Depraved may refer to:

 Depraved: The Shocking True Story of America's First Serial Killer, American true crime book by Harold Schechter about the murders of H.H. Holmes